The  Magic  is a Chesapeake Bay log canoe, built in 1894, by Charles Tarr in St. Michaels, Maryland, She measures 34'-3 5/8" long with a beam of 6'-11". She served as a commercial oystering vessel until 1924 when she was returned to her sailing rig. After her conversion Magic proved to be one of the fastest canoes on the Bay, winning the first Governor's Cup race in 1927. She one of the last 22 surviving traditional Chesapeake Bay racing log canoes that carry on a tradition of racing on the Eastern Shore of Maryland that has existed since the 1840s. She is located at St. Michaels, Talbot County, Maryland.

She was listed on the National Register of Historic Places in 1985.

References

External links
, including photo in 1984, at Maryland Historical Trust

Ships in Talbot County, Maryland
Ships on the National Register of Historic Places in Maryland
National Register of Historic Places in Talbot County, Maryland